San Antonio Huitepec is a town and municipality in Oaxaca in south-western Mexico. The municipality covers an area of 199.04 km². 
It is part of the Zaachila District in the west of the Valles Centrales Region

As of 2005, the municipality had a total population of 4303.

References

Municipalities of Oaxaca